The men's flyweight event was part of the boxing programme at the 1956 Summer Olympics.  The weight class was the lightest contested, and allowed boxers of up to 51 kilograms to compete. The competition was held from 23 November to 1 December 1956. 19 boxers from 19 nations competed.

Medalists

Results

First round
 Vladimir Stolnikov (URS) def. Edgar Basel (FRG), on points
 Terence Spinks (GBR) def. Samuel Harris (PAK), on points
 Abel Laudonio (ARG) def. Albert Ludick (RSA), on points

Second round
 Mircea Dobrescu (ROU) def. Federico Bonus (PHI), on points
 Ray Perez (USA) def. František Majdloch (CZE), on points
 John Caldwell (IRL) def. Yaishwe Best (BUR), referee stopped the contest (3rd round)
 Warner Batchelor (AUS) def. Henryk Kukier (POL), on points
 Kenji Yonekura (JPN) def. Phajol Muangson (THA), on points
 René Libeer (FRA) def. Pyo Hyeon-gi (KOR), on points
 Vladimir Stolnikov (URS) def. Salvatore Burruni (ITA), on points
 Terence Spinks (GBR) def. Abel Laudonio (ARG), on points

Quarterfinals
 Mircea Dobrescu (ROU) def. Ray Perez (USA), on points
 John Caldwell (IRL) def. Warner Batchelor (AUS), on points
 René Libeer (FRA) def. Kenji Yonekura (JPN), on points
 Terence Spinks (GBR) def. Vladimir Stolnikov (URS), on points

Semifinals
 Mircea Dobrescu (ROU) def. John Caldwell (IRL), on points
 Terence Spinks (GBR) def. René Libeer (FRA), on points

Final
 Terence Spinks (GBR) def. Mircea Dobrescu (ROU), on points

References

 https://web.archive.org/web/20080912181829/http://www.la84foundation.org/6oic/OfficialReports/1956/OR1956.pdf

Flyweight